Talavak (also Romanized as Talāvak and Talāvok) is a village in Farim Rural District, Dodangeh District, Sari County, Mazandaran Province, Iran. At the 2006 census, its population was 207, in 67 families.

References 

Populated places in Sari County